Cordisburgo is a municipality in the state of Minas Gerais in the Southeast region of Brazil.

It is the birthplace of the writer João Guimarães Rosa.

See also
List of municipalities in Minas Gerais

References

Municipalities in Minas Gerais